Sahibkay Cheema is a village located in the Sambrial Tehsil of Sialkot District in the north of Punjab province of Pakistan. Sahibkay Cheema is situated on the bank of the Nullah Aik. The village has agricultural land.

Villages in Sialkot District